Michel Rivard (born August 7, 1941) is a Canadian politician, former senator, and former member of the National Assembly of Quebec.

Career 
Rivard holds a certificate in administrative sciences from Laval University.  Throughout the 1970s he held various managerial positions in the Quebec business world.

From 1980 to 1984 he was mayor of Beauport, and from 1985 to 1988 he was director of the Federation of Canadian Municipalities.  From 1991 to 1994 he served on the executive committee of the Society of Economic Development for the Region of Quebec.

In the 1994 Quebec election, Rivard ran in the riding of Limoilou representing the Parti Québécois and was elected.  He served in various backbench roles in the PQ government, including as Assistant to the Minister responsible for the Quebec region (from January 19, 1996 to October 28, 1998).  As a PQ member he campaigned for Quebec sovereignty during the 1995 Quebec referendum.

In the 1998 election, Rivard lost his seat to Liberal candidate Michel Després.

In the 2000 Canadian federal election, he attempted a political comeback running in the riding of Québec under the banner of the Canadian Alliance, a considerable departure from his previous political affiliation.  He lost to Bloc Québécois candidate Christiane Gagnon.

In December 2008 he was appointed to the Senate of Canada as a Conservative by Canadian Prime Minister Stephen Harper. After being shut out of the 2015 federal election campaign, he quit the Tory caucus to sit as an independent.

References

External links 

1941 births
Canadian Alliance candidates for the Canadian House of Commons
Candidates in the 2000 Canadian federal election
Canadian senators from Quebec
Conservative Party of Canada senators
French Quebecers
Living people
Mayors of places in Quebec
Parti Québécois MNAs
Politicians from Quebec City
Université Laval alumni
21st-century Canadian politicians